Andrott Island, also known as Androth Island, is a small inhabited island in the Union Territory of Lakshadweep, a group of 36 coral islands scattered in the Arabian Sea off the western coast of India

History
Andrott Island had been known as 'Divanduru' in the past, a name that is found in some old French maps. It belongs to the Laccadive Islands subgroup, which had been historically a part of the Arakkal Kingdom.

Geography
Andrott Island is the nearest to the mainland from all the islands in the group and it is also the longest, as well as the biggest (area-wise) island.

Demographics
Most of the inhabitants are Muslims with a presence of Hindu minority. The Saint Ubaidullah who is believed to have preached Islam in Lakshadweep Islands, died here. His remains are entombed in the Jumah mosque.

The island also houses several Buddhist archaeological remains.

Administration
The island belongs to the township of Andrott of Andrott Tehsil.

Climate

Image gallery

References

External links

Islands of Lakshadweep
Atolls of India
Cities and towns in Lakshadweep district
Islands of India
Populated places in India